Rathaus Reinickendorf (Reinickendorf Town Hall) is a Berlin U-Bahn station located on the U8.
It was designed in 1994 by architect R.G.Rümmler.

The station was actually planned to connect to U5, as a terminus station but was cancelled in 2016.

References

U8 (Berlin U-Bahn) stations
Railway stations in Germany opened in 1994
Buildings and structures in Reinickendorf